The 1917 Morningside Maroons football team represented the Morningside College during the 1917 college football season. In Jason M. Saunderson's fifth season with the Maroons, Morningside compiled a 5–1 record, and outscored their opponents 207 to 27.

Schedule

References

Morningside
Morningside Mustangs football seasons
Morningside Maroons football